The Bernardini S/A Industria e Comercio (Bernardini Industrial and Commerce Company), of Sao Paulo, Brazil, was a safe manufacturer which operated from 1912 to 1992. During its later years it branched out into vehicle production.

Products

 Bernardini X1A1 Light Tank
 Bernardini MB-3 Tamoyo tank
 Bernardini Xingu BT25 and BT50 (4 x 4) light vehicles (Brazil), Jeep like vehicles and are based closely on the Toyota Bandeirante

References
 D. Hanel "The Defence Industry of Latin America" Military Technology 3/2010 ISSN 0722-3226

Defunct motor vehicle manufacturers of Brazil
Defence companies of Brazil
Defunct defence companies of Brazil
Manufacturing companies based in São Paulo